Below is the list of populated places in Muş Province, Turkey by the districts. In the following lists first place in each list is the administrative center of the district.

Muş
 Muş
 Ağaçlık, Muş
 Ağartı, Muş
 Ağıllı, Muş
 Akkonak, Muş
 Akpınar, Muş
 Alagün, Muş
 Alaniçi, Muş
 Alican, Muş
 Aligedik, Muş
 Arıköy, Muş
 Arpayazı, Muş
 Aşağısızma, Muş
 Aşağıyongalı, Muş
 Aydoğan, Muş
 Bağlar, Muş
 Bahçeköy, Muş
 Beşparmak, Muş
 Bilek, Muş
 Bostankent, Muş
 Boyuncuk, Muş
 Bozbulut, Muş
 Cevizlidere, Muş
 Çatbaşı, Muş
 Çiçekli, Muş
 Çöğürlü, Muş
 Çukurbağ, Muş
 Derecik, Muş
 Dereyurt, Muş
 Dilimli, Muş
 Donatım, Muş
 Dumlusu, Muş
 Durugöze, Muş
 Eğirmeç, Muş
 Ekindüzü, Muş
 Elçiler, Muş
 Eralanı, Muş
 Erencik, Muş
 Gölköy, Muş
 Güdümlü, Muş
 Gümüşali, Muş
 Gündoğan, Muş
 Güzeltepe, Muş
 Harman, Muş
 Ilıca, Muş
 İnardı, Muş
 Kalecik, Muş
 Karaağaçlı, Muş
 Karabey, Muş
 Karaköprü, Muş
 Karakuyu, Muş
 Karameşe, Muş
 Karlıdere, Muş
 Kayalısu, Muş
 Kayaşık, Muş
 Keçidere, Muş
 Kepenek, Muş
 Kırköy, Muş
 Kıyıbaşı, Muş
 Kıyık, Muş
 Kızılağaç, Muş
 Konukbekler, Muş
 Köşk, Muş
 Kumluca, Muş
 Kutlugün, Muş
 Mercimekkale, Muş
 Mescitli, Muş
 Muratgören, Muş
 Nadaslık, Muş
 Ortakent, Muş
 Özdilek, Muş
 Sarıdal, Muş
 Savaşçılar, Muş
 Serinova, Muş
 Soğucak, Muş
 Suboyu, Muş
 Sudurağı, Muş
 Suluca, Muş
 Sungu, Muş
 Suvaran, Muş
 Sürügüden, Muş
 Sütlüce, Muş
 Şenoba, Muş
 Tabanlı, Muş
 Tandoğan, Muş
 Taşoluk, Muş
 Tekyol, Muş
 Toprakkale, Muş
 Tüten, Muş
 Ulukaya, Muş
 Üçdere, Muş
 Üçevler, Muş
 Üçsırt, Muş
 Yarpuzlu, Muş
 Yaygin, Muş
 Yazla, Muş
 Yelalan, Muş
 Yeşilce, Muş
 Yeşilova, Muş
 Yoncalıöz, Muş
 Yörecik, Muş
 Yukarısızma, Muş
 Yukarıyongalı, Muş
 Yücetepe, Muş
 Ziyaret, Muş

Bulanık
 Bulanık
 Adıvar, Bulanık
 Akçaarmut, Bulanık
 Akçakaynak, Bulanık
 Altınoluk, Bulanık
 Arakonak, Bulanık
 Aşağıbüklü, Bulanık
 Balotu, Bulanık
 Bostancılar, Bulanık
 Büngüldek, Bulanık
 Cankurtaran, Bulanık
 Çataklı, Bulanık
 Çaygeldi, Bulanık
 Değirmensuyu, Bulanık
 Demirkapı, Bulanık
 Doğantepe, Bulanık
 Dokuzpınar, Bulanık
 Elmakaya, Bulanık
 Erentepe, Bulanık
 Ericek, Bulanık
 Esenlik, Bulanık
 Eskiyol, Bulanık
 Gölyanı, Bulanık
 Göztepe, Bulanık
 Gülçimen, Bulanık
 Gümüşpınar, Bulanık
 Günbatmaz, Bulanık
 Gündüzü, Bulanık
 Günyurdu, Bulanık
 Han, Bulanık
 Hoşgeldi, Bulanık
 Karaağıl, Bulanık
 Karaburun, Bulanık
 Karacaören, Bulanık
 Kırkgöze, Bulanık
 Kotanlı, Bulanık
 Koyunağılı, Bulanık
 Köprüyolu, Bulanık
 Kurganlı, Bulanık
 Meşeiçi, Bulanık
 Molladavut, Bulanık
 Mollakent, Bulanık
 Oğlakkaya, Bulanık
 Okçular, Bulanık
 Olurdere, Bulanık
 Örenkent, Bulanık
 Rüstemgedik, Bulanık
 Samanyolu, Bulanık
 Sarıpınar, Bulanık
 Seçme, Bulanık
 Sıradere, Bulanık
 Söğütlü, Bulanık
 Sultanlı, Bulanık
 Şatırlar, Bulanık
 Şehittahir, Bulanık
 Şehitveren, Bulanık
 Toklular, Bulanık
 Uzgörür, Bulanık
 Üçtepe, Bulanık
 Yazbaşı, Bulanık
 Yemişen, Bulanık
 Yokuşbaşı, Bulanık
 Yoncalı, Bulanık

Hasköy
 Hasköy, Muş
 Aşağıüçdam, Hasköy
 Azıklı, Hasköy
 Böğürdelen, Hasköy
 Büvetli, Hasköy
 Dağdibi, Hasköy
 Düzkışla, Hasköy
 Elmabulak, Hasköy
 Eşmepınar, Hasköy
 Gökyazı, Hasköy
 Karakütük, Hasköy
 Koç, Hasköy
 Koğuktaş, Hasköy
 Ortanca, Hasköy
 Otaç, Hasköy
 Sarıbahçe, Hasköy
 Umurca, Hasköy
 Yarkaya, Hasköy
 Yukarıüçdam, Hasköy

Korkut
 Korkut
 Akyıldız, Korkut
 Alazlı, Korkut
 Altınova, Korkut
 Balkır, Korkut
 Çalaplı, Korkut
 Çınarardı, Korkut
 Değirmitaş, Korkut
 Demirci, Korkut
 Durucak, Korkut
 Düzova, Korkut
 Gültepe, Korkut
 Güneyik, Korkut
 Güven, Korkut
 İçboğaz, Korkut
 Kapılı, Korkut
 Karakale, Korkut
 Kocatarla, Korkut
 Konakdüzü, Korkut
 Mollababa, Korkut
 Oğulbalı, Korkut
 Pınarüstü, Korkut
 Sarmaşık, Korkut
 Sazlıkbaşı, Korkut
 Tan, Korkut
 Taşlıca, Korkut
 Yedipınar, Korkut
 Yolgözler, Korkut
 Yünören, Korkut
 Yürekli, Korkut

Malazgirt
 Malazgirt
 Adaksu, Malazgirt
 Ağılbaşı, Malazgirt
 Akalan, Malazgirt
 Akören, Malazgirt
 Alikalkan, Malazgirt
 Alyar, Malazgirt
 Aradere, Malazgirt
 Arslankaya, Malazgirt
 Aşağıkıcık, Malazgirt
 Aynalıhoca, Malazgirt
 Bademözü, Malazgirt
 Bahçe, Malazgirt
 Balkaya, Malazgirt
 Beşçatak, Malazgirt
 Beşdam, Malazgirt
 Beypınar, Malazgirt
 Bilala, Malazgirt
 Bostankaya, Malazgirt
 Boyçapkın, Malazgirt
 Boyundere, Malazgirt
 Çayırdere, Malazgirt
 Çiçekveren, Malazgirt
 Dirimpınar, Malazgirt
 Doğantaş, Malazgirt
 Dolabaş, Malazgirt
 Erence, Malazgirt
 Fenek, Malazgirt
 Gölağılı, Malazgirt
 Güleç, Malazgirt
 Gülkoru, Malazgirt
 Güzelbaba, Malazgirt
 Hancağız, Malazgirt
 Hanoğlu, Malazgirt
 Hasanpaşa, Malazgirt
 Hasretpınar, Malazgirt
 İyikomşu, Malazgirt
 Kadıköy, Malazgirt
 Karaali, Malazgirt
 Karahasan, Malazgirt
 Karakaya, Malazgirt
 Karakoç, Malazgirt
 Kardeşler, Malazgirt
 Karıncalı, Malazgirt
 Kazgöl, Malazgirt
 Kılıççı, Malazgirt
 Kızılyusuf, Malazgirt
 Koçali, Malazgirt
 Konakkuran, Malazgirt
 Kulcak, Malazgirt
 Kuruca, Malazgirt
 Laladağı, Malazgirt
 Mağalcık, Malazgirt
 Mezraaköy, Malazgirt
 Mollabaki, Malazgirt
 Molladerman, Malazgirt
 Muratkolu, Malazgirt
 Nurettin, Malazgirt
 Odaköy, Malazgirt
 Oğuzhan, Malazgirt
 Okçuhan, Malazgirt
 Örenşar, Malazgirt
 Sarıdavut, Malazgirt
 Selekutu, Malazgirt
 Sırtdüzü, Malazgirt
 Söğütlü, Malazgirt
 Tatargazi, Malazgirt
 Tatlıca, Malazgirt
 Tıkızlı, Malazgirt
 Ulusu, Malazgirt
 Uyanık, Malazgirt
 Yapraklı, Malazgirt
 Yaramış, Malazgirt
 Yolgözler, Malazgirt
 Yukarıkıcık, Malazgirt
 Yurtseven, Malazgirt

Varto
 Varto
 Acarkent, Varto
 Ağaçaltı, Varto
 Ağaçkorur, Varto
 Akçatepe, Varto
 Alabalık, Varto
 Anlıaçık, Varto
 Armutkaşı, Varto
 Aşağı Alagöz, Varto
 Aşağı Hacıbey, Varto
 Bağiçi, Varto
 Baltaş, Varto
 Başkent, Varto
 Beşikkaya, Varto
 Boyalı, Varto
 Boylu, Varto
 Buzlugöze, Varto
 Çalıdere, Varto
 Çaltılı, Varto
 Çayçatı, Varto
 Çayıryolu, Varto
 Çaylar, Varto
 Çayönü, Varto
 Çobandağı, Varto
 Dağcılar, Varto
 Dallıöz, Varto
 Değerli, Varto
 Derince, Varto
 Diktepeler, Varto
 Doğanca, Varto
 Dönertaş, Varto
 Durucabulak, Varto
 Dutözü, Varto
 Erdoğan, Varto
 Eryurdu, Varto
 Esenler, Varto
 Gelintaşı, Varto
 Göltepe, Varto
 Gölyayla, Varto
 Görgü, Varto
 Güzeldere, Varto
 Güzelkent, Varto
 Haksever, Varto
 Hüseyinoğlu, Varto
 İçmeler, Varto
 İlbey, Varto
 Kalecik, Varto
 Karaköy, Varto
 Karameşe, Varto
 Karapınar, Varto
 Kartaldere, Varto
 Kayadelen, Varto
 Kayalıdere, Varto
 Kayalık, Varto
 Kayalıkale, Varto
 Kaygıntaş, Varto
 Kaynarca, Varto
 Koçyatağı, Varto
 Kolan, Varto
 Köprücük, Varto
 Kumlukıyı, Varto
 Kuşluk, Varto
 Küçüktepe, Varto
 Leylek, Varto
 Ocaklı, Varto
 Oğlakçı, Varto
 Omcalı, Varto
 Onpınar, Varto
 Ölçekli, Varto
 Özenç, Varto
 Özkonak, Varto
 Sağlıcak, Varto
 Sanlıca, Varto
 Sazlıca, Varto
 Seki, Varto
 Taşçı, Varto
 Taşdibek, Varto
 Taşlıyayla, Varto
 Teknedüzü, Varto
 Tepe, Varto
 Tuzlu, Varto
 Ulusırt, Varto
 Üçbulak, Varto
 Ünaldı, Varto
 Yarlısu, Varto
 Yayıklı, Varto
 Yayla, Varto
 Yedikavak, Varto
 Yeşildal, Varto
 Yeşilpınar, Varto
 Yılanlı, Varto
 Yukarı Hacıbey, Varto
 Yurttutan, Varto
 Zorabat, Varto

References

list
Mus